Domingas Munhemeze (born 28 May 2002) is a Mozambican swimmer.

In 2019, she represented Mozambique at the 2019 World Aquatics Championships held in Gwangju, South Korea. She competed in the women's 50 metre freestyle event. She did not advance to compete in the semi-finals. She also competed in the women's 50 metre butterfly event and in this event she also did not advance to compete in the semi-finals.

References 

Living people
2002 births
Place of birth missing (living people)
Mozambican female butterfly swimmers
Female butterfly swimmers